Michael Deacon may refer to:
Michael the Deacon, 16th century Oriental Orthodox deacon 
Michael Deacon (actor) (1933–2000), Scottish actor 
Michael Deacon (journalist) (born 1980), British journalist
Michael Deacon (bishop) (died 1500), bishop of St Asaph